Leo vehicle refers to:
A satellite in Low Earth Orbit
A police car (LEO standing for Law Enforcement Officer)